Cape Borda  is a headland in the Australian state of South Australia located in the gazetted locality of Cape Borda on the north west tip of Kangaroo Island  about  west of the municipal seat of Kingscote.  It was named after Jean-Charles de Borda (1733–1799), the French mathematician, physicist, naturalist and sailor, by the Baudin expedition to Australia during January 1803. It has been the site of an operating lighthouse since 1858 and is currently located within the Flinders Chase National Park.

Description 
It is the most north westerly point of the Kangaroo Island coast. It is the termination for a pair of coastlines – the western coastline extending from Cape du Couedic in the south and the northern coastline extending from Point Marsden in the east.

Formation, geology & oceanography 
Cape Borda was formed when the sea reached its present level 7,500 years ago after sea levels started to rise at the start of the Holocene.
The cliff line which includes Cape Borda consists of base strata of a metasandstone belonging to the Kanmantoo group bedrock such as Middleton Sandstone and Balquhidder Formation, overlaid by a relatively thick capping of Bridgewater Formation calcarenite rock.

History

Aboriginal use 
By 1999, the literature had not cited any archaeological discoveries specific to Aboriginal use of land in the immediate vicinity of Cape Borda.

European discovery 
Cape Borda was named in January 1803 by the Baudin expedition of 1800-03 in the memory of Jean-Charles de Borda (1733–1799), the French mathematician, physicist, naturalist and sailor.

Navigation aid 

The lighthouse at Cape Borda was the third of three provided for by legislation; the others being erected at Cape Willoughby and Troubridge Shoals (now called Troubridge Island).  The light was officially lit on 13 July 1858 and was named the ‘Flinders Light’ in August 1858 in memory of Matthew Flinders.

Fauna 
The coast near the Cape Borda lighthouse previously supported colonies of little penguins which are now believed to be extinct. Causes for local extinction are likely to include (but not be limited to) predation by increasing New Zealand fur seal populations and changes in prey availability.

Protected area status 
Cape Borda is currently located within the protected area known as the Flinders Chase National Park.  As of 2012, the waters surrounding its shores are part of a sanctuary zone located within the boundaries of the Western Kangaroo Island Marine Park.

Climate

See also 
 Loch Sloy

References

External links 
  Department of Environment, Water and Natural Resources official page for Cape Borda Lightstation

Borda
Investigator Strait